Theresa Brown may refer to:
Theresa Wiggin, a character in the Ender's Game series
Theresa Brown (author), American author